Hellen Onsando Obiri (born 13 December 1989) is a Kenyan middle- and long-distance runner. She is a two-time Olympic 5000 metres silver medallist from the 2016 Rio and 2020 Tokyo Olympics, where she also placed fourth over the 10,000 metres. She is a two-time world champion after winning the 5000m in 2017 and again in 2019, when she set a new championship record. Obiri also took bronze for the 1500 metres in 2013 and silver in the 10,000m in 2022. She won the 3000 metres race at the 2012 World Indoor Championships, claimed silver in 2014, and placed fourth in 2018. She holds the Kenyan national records for the mile, 3000 metres both out and indoors, and 5000 metres events.

Obiri won the women's race at the  2019 World Cross Country Championship. She places fifth in the half marathon on the world all-time list.

She was cited as one of the Top 100 most influential Africans by New African magazine in 2017.

Career
Obiri gained her first international experience at the 2011 Military World Games in Rio de Janeiro, where she won the bronze medal for the 800 metres and placed fourth in the 1500 metres.

In 2012, she took her first global title competing at the World Indoor Championships held in Istanbul, clocking 8:37.16 over the 3000 metres.

After bronze for the 1500m event at the 2013 World Championships in Moscow, Obiri earned the silver medal in the 3000m at the World Indoor Championships in Sopot a year later. She finished behind only multiple world record-holder Genzebe Dibaba. In 2014, she added 1500m title from the African Championships.

At the 2016 Rio Olympics, Obiri competed in the 5000 metres and earned the silver medal in a time of 14:29.77, behind compatriot Vivian Cheruiyot in an Olympic record of 14:26.17 and ahead of Ethiopia's Almaz Ayana who ran 14:33.59.

Obiri represented Kenya at the 2017 World Championships in London and won the gold medal for the 5000m event ahead of Almaz Ayana and Sifan Hassan.

In March 2019, Obiri won the women's senior race at the IAAF World Cross Country Championship. The event took place in Aarhus, Denmark. She won the 10.2 km race in a time of 36:14. After she posted best times of the year in the 5000 metres in 2017 and 2018, Obiri won the event at the Doha World Championships in October, setting a championship record of 14:26.72 in the process. Margaret Kipkemboi and Konstanze Klosterhalfen finished second and third, respectively.

Obiri represented Kenya at the 2020 Tokyo Olympics in both the women's 5000 metres and 10,000 metres events. She won the silver medal at the former in a time of 14:38.36, finishing behind only Hassan who ran 14:36.79; Gudaf Tsegay took bronze in 14:38.87. Obiri placed fourth in the 10,000m final in a personal best behind Hassan, Kalkidan Gezahegne and Letesenbet Gidey.

At the 2022 World Championships in Eugene, Oregon, she competed only in the 10,000m event and was beaten to gold by Letesenbet Gidey in a very close finish (the top 3 were only separated by 0.13 s). Letensebet clocked 30:09.94, Obiri achieved personal best of 30:10.02, while her third-placed compatriot Margaret Kipkemboi was third in 30:10.07.

She capped her fine 2022 season (64:22  at RAK half in February; wins at Istanbul Half Marathon, Great Manchester Run and Great North Run) in November debuting in the marathon at the New York City Marathon, where she placed sixth.

Achievements

International competitions

Circuit wins and titles
 Diamond League champion (2) (5000 m):  2017,  2018
 2013 (1) – 1500m: Eugene Prefontaine Classic
 2014 [2] – Doha Diamond League (3000m), Eugene (1500m,  MR)
 2016 [2] – Eugene (5000m, PB), Monaco Herculis (3000m)
 2017 [5] – Shanghai Diamond League (5000m, WL PB), Rome Golden Gala (5000m, WL ), London Grand Prix (Mile MR NR), Monaco (3000m, WL), Brussels Memorial Van Damme (5000m)
 2018 (2) – 5000m: Rabat Meeting International, Weltklasse Zürich
 2019 [2] – Doha (3000m, WL), London (5000m, WL MR)
 2020 [2] – Monaco (5000m, WL MR), Doha (3000m, WL)
 2021 (1) – 5000m: Oslo Bislett Games

National titles
 Kenyan Athletics Championships
 1500 metres: 2011, 2012, 2013, 2014
 5000 metres: 2018
 Kenyan Cross Country Championships
 Senior women's race: 2019

Personal bests

References

External links

 

1989 births
Living people
Kenyan female middle-distance runners
Athletes (track and field) at the 2012 Summer Olympics
Athletes (track and field) at the 2016 Summer Olympics
Olympic athletes of Kenya
Athletes (track and field) at the 2014 Commonwealth Games
Athletes (track and field) at the 2018 Commonwealth Games
Olympic silver medalists for Kenya
Olympic silver medalists in athletics (track and field)
Medalists at the 2016 Summer Olympics
World Athletics record holders (relay)
World Athletics Championships athletes for Kenya
World Athletics Championships medalists
People from Kisii County
Commonwealth Games medallists in athletics
Commonwealth Games gold medallists for Kenya
World Athletics Championships winners
African Championships in Athletics winners
Diamond League winners
World Athletics Indoor Championships winners
Commonwealth Games gold medallists in athletics
Athletes (track and field) at the 2020 Summer Olympics
Medalists at the 2020 Summer Olympics
20th-century Kenyan women
21st-century Kenyan women
World Athletics Cross Country Championships winners
Medallists at the 2018 Commonwealth Games